Emil Rothardt (born Emil Czerwinski; 8 March 1905 – 16 February 1969) was a German footballer who played as a left winger. He played from 1923 until 1935 for Schalke 04. He won two German championships with the club.

References

External links
 

1905 births
1969 deaths
Association football forwards
German footballers
FC Schalke 04 players
Sportspeople from Gelsenkirchen
Footballers from North Rhine-Westphalia